Saroj Mohan Institute of Technology (commonly SMIT) is a co-educational private engineering college located in Guptipara, West Bengal, India. SMIT is affiliated to Maulana Abul Kalam Azad University of Technology, West Bengal and approved by All India Council for Technical Education.

Academics
SMIT's undergraduate courses offer B.Tech. in several disciplines, including Information Technology. It also offers bachelor's degree in several management courses - Bachelor of Business Administration and Bachelor of Computer Applications.

Facilities
 Elementary Library
 Various Laboratories
 Extra Curricular Activity Podium
 Workshops
 Placement Cell
 Boys and Girls Hostel
 Computer labs
 Internet Access
 Cafeteria

See also

References

External links
 Official Website

Private engineering colleges in India
Engineering colleges in West Bengal
Universities and colleges in Hooghly district
Colleges affiliated to West Bengal University of Technology
Educational institutions established in 2003
2003 establishments in West Bengal